Democracy International means:

 Democracy International eV, a German organization with an international focus on the promotion of direct democracy
 Democracy International, Inc, a U.S. organization that advises and assists on behalf of governments, ministries and NGOs in democracy and governance projects